João Mendes de Briteiros (1250-?) was a Portuguese nobleman, who served in the Court of Denis of Portugal.

Biography 

João was born in the Iberian Peninsula, son of Mem Rodrigues de Briteiros and Maria Anes da Veiga, a noble lady descendant of Forjaz Vermuis, belonging to the Lords of Trastámara and Maia. He was married to Urraca Afonso, daughter of Afonso III of Portugal and his mistress Madragana.

References 

1250 births
13th-century Portuguese people
Portuguese nobility
Portuguese Roman Catholics